The thirty-second season of the American animated television series The Simpsons premiered on Fox on September 27, 2020, and ended on May 23, 2021. This season contained twenty-two episodes. On February 6, 2019, the season was ordered along with the previous season. This season includes the series' 700th episode "Manger Things".

Episodes

Production

Animation 
The season was produced during the COVID-19 pandemic, which impacted many other television productions, but left animated production largely unaffected. Executive producer James L. Brooks encouraged the staff to begin working from their homes in early March 2020, before California's stay-at-home order was declared. In an interview with The Hollywood Reporter in late March 2020, showrunner Al Jean stated, "Production hasn't skipped a day or lost a beat." At that point seven episodes for the season, including the Treehouse of Horror episode, were already completed, and they had started reading the remainder of the twenty-two total. Jean also stated that "we're a little ahead of where we usually are." The series had a panel at the 2020 San Diego Comic-Con, which was marketed as "Comic-Con@Home", to promote the season, with Jean, Matt Selman, David Silverman, Carolyn Omine, and Mike B. Anderson on the panel, with series regular Yeardley Smith serving as moderator.

Casting
On June 26, 2020, it was stated that "Moving forward, The Simpsons will no longer have white actors voice non-white characters." This follows Mike Henry stating that he will no longer voice the African-American character Cleveland Brown on fellow Fox animated series Family Guy, and Jenny Slate and Kristen Bell's announcement that they will no longer voice mixed-race characters on Big Mouth and Central Park, respectively, in the wake of the George Floyd protests. It also follows series regular Hank Azaria's January 2020 announcement that he will no longer voice the Indian character Apu Nahasapeemapetilon on The Simpsons. Series regular Harry Shearer was not fully in agreement with the decision, stating that "the job of the actor is to play someone who they're not". On September 24, 2020 due to the George Floyd protests, it was announced that Alex Désert would voice Carl Carlson in the first episode of the season, taking over from Azaria who voiced the character since the first season. He also became the new voice of Lou. 

On October 11, 2020, Jean announced that Eric Lopez would begin voicing Bumblebee Man in the episode "Now Museum, Now You Don't" instead of Azaria, who had provided the voice of the character since his introduction in season four. On December 10, 2020, the official logline on FOXFLASH for the episode "The Dad-Feelings Limited" revealed that Kumiko would be voiced by Jenny Yokobori instead of Tress MacNeille, who had voiced the character since her introduction in the season twenty-five episode "Married to the Blob." In the episode "Uncut Femmes", the character of Julio was recast to Tony Rodriguez. On February 22, 2021, it was announced that beginning with "Wad Goals", voice actor Kevin Michael Richardson, who joined the show since Season 21 as different minor characters, would replace Harry Shearer as Dr. Hibbert and in the same episode voice actress Kimberly Brooks took on the role of Lewis Clark. David Harbour, Olivia Colman, Ben Platt, Hannibal Buress, and Michael Palin have guest-starred during the season. Series regular Yeardley Smith also played herself.

Release
The season aired on Sundays during the 2020–21 television season as part of Fox's Animation Domination programming block, along with Bless the Harts, Bob's Burgers, The Great North and Family Guy. One day after an episode aired on Fox, it was also made available on Hulu. It was made available for streaming in the US on  Disney+ on September 29, 2021. and in the UK on November 3, 2021.

Reception

Ratings

Notes

References

External links

Simpsons season 32
2020 American television seasons
2021 American television seasons